Benjamin Franklin Grady (October 10, 1831 – March 6, 1914) was a teacher, US Congressman and author from North Carolina. He represented the state's 3rd district in the U.S. Congress from 1891 to 1895.

He was born near Sarecta, Duplin County, North Carolina, October 10, 1831. He married Olivia Penelope Hamilton on May 30, 1861 in Huntsville, Texas.

He was teaching mathematics and natural sciences at Austin College in Texas when the Civil War began. He left to join the Confederate Army, serving in Company K, 25th Regiment of the Texas Cavalry. He married Mary Charlotte Bizzell on November 10, 1870 in Clinton, North Carolina. In 1890 he defeated African-American Republican John S. Leary in a race  for a seat in the US House of Representatives. He was re-elected for a second term, both times serving North Carolina 3rd District. He was Superintendent of Schools, Duplin Co., N.C. In 1899, he published the book The Case of the South Against the North, which uses historical evidence to justify the South's war against the North on the basis of constitutional principles. He died in Clinton, Sampson County, N.C., March 6, 1914.

References

External links

 

1831 births
1914 deaths
Democratic Party members of the United States House of Representatives from North Carolina
19th-century American politicians
Neo-Confederates
Schoolteachers from North Carolina
Confederate States Army officers